The Banco Bilbao Vizcaya (formerly Banco de Bilbao) is a building located at Calle de Alcalá, 16, in Madrid, Spain. Projected in 1919 by architect Ricardo Bastida (1879–1953) and built from 1920 to 1923 for Banco de Bilbao, a constituent financial institution of BBVA.
It was declared Bien de Interés Cultural in 1999. The rotunda features murals painted by Aurelio Arteta in 1922 and restored in 2003.

In popular culture 
The final fight in the 2000 Spanish film La comunidad was shot among the quadrigas atop of the building.

References 

Buildings and structures completed in 1923
Buildings and structures in Cortes neighborhood, Madrid
Bien de Interés Cultural landmarks in Madrid
1920s in Spain
Banco Bilbao Vizcaya Argentaria
Bank buildings in Spain
Calle de Alcalá